Dmytro Oleksandrovych Voloshyn (born 29 April 1986) is a Ukrainian football defender who last played for Veikkausliiga club IFK Mariehamn.

Club history
Dmytro Voloshyn began his football career in Olimpik-UOR youth club in Donetsk.

References

External links
  Profile – Official IFK Mariehamn site
 

1986 births
Living people
Footballers from Donetsk
Ukrainian footballers
Veikkausliiga players
FC Shakhtar-2 Donetsk players
FC Shakhtar-3 Donetsk players
FC Olimpik Donetsk players
IFK Mariehamn players
Ukrainian expatriate footballers
Expatriate footballers in Finland
Ukrainian expatriate sportspeople in Finland
Association football defenders
Ukrainian First League players
Ukrainian Second League players